Chüy is a village in the Chüy Region of Kyrgyzstan. It is part of the Chüy District. Its population was 12,688 in 2021. It is adjacent to the former regional capital, the city of Tokmok.

Since Chüy is adjacent to Tokmok, the two settlements together are sometimes informally referred to as the "city of Chüy-Tokmok" (Чүй-Токмок; sometimes, Chuy-Tokmak, Чуй-Токмак).

Population

References

External links 
  Чуйская областная госадминистрация: Чуйский район (The Government of the Chüy Region: Chüy District) 

Populated places in Chüy Region